is a railway station on the Furano Line in Kamifurano, Hokkaido, Japan, operated by the Hokkaido Railway Company (JR Hokkaido).

Lines
Kami-Furano Station is served by the Furano Line, and is numbered "F39". Only all-stations "Local" train services stop at this station.

History
The station opened on 15 November 1899. With the privatization of Japanese National Railways (JNR) on 1 April 1987, the station came under the control of JR Hokkaido.

Surrounding area
  Route 237
 JGSDF Camp Kami-Furano

See also
 List of railway stations in Japan

External links
Station information by JR Hokkaido Asahikawa Branch 

Stations of Hokkaido Railway Company
Railway stations in Hokkaido Prefecture
Railway stations in Japan opened in 1899